Naked is the only studio album by English electronic music group Blue Pearl, released in 1990 on the Big Life record label. The album includes Blue Pearl's biggest hit single "Naked in the Rain" (UK No. 4) and the follow-up single "Little Brother" (UK No. 31). It also includes a cover of "Running Up That Hill" by Kate Bush.

Track listing
All tracks written by Durga McBroom, except where noted.

Personnel
Adapted from AllMusic.

Blue Pearl
Durga McBroom – keyboards, vocals
Youth – drum programming, guitar, bass guitar, keyboards, producer

with:

Gary Barnacle – saxophone
Michael Bigwood – mixing
Stephen Chase – mixing
Marius de Vries – mixing
Fred Defaye – mixing
Andy Falconer – engineer
Adam Fuest – engineer, mixing
David Gilmour – guitar
Howard Gray – mixing, producer
Trevor Gray – keyboards, producer, programming
Sarah Gregory – artwork, illustrations
Mike Jarratt – engineer
Simon "The Funky Ginger" Law – piano
Pete Lorimer – engineer
Ian McKell – photography
Mark O'Donoughue – engineer
Tim Parry – executive producer
Guy Pratt – bass guitar 
Tim Renwick – guitar
Steve Sidelnyk – mixing
Jazz Summers – executive producer
Thrash – engineer
Mark "Tufty" Evans – engineer
Joel "Tyrrell" LeBlanc – engineer
Gary Wallis – percussion
Dave Williams – guitar
Gavyn Wright – string arrangements
Richard Wright – keyboards

Charts

References

External links
Naked at Discogs

1990 debut albums
Albums produced by Youth (musician)